The 2000 European Super Touring Cup was the 27th season of European touring car racing and the first since 1988. The championship started at Mugello on 2 April and ended after ten events at Cerklje ob Krki on 8 October. The championship was won by Fabrizio Giovanardi driving for Nordauto Engineering in an Alfa Romeo 156.

Teams and drivers

Guest drivers in italics.

Results and standings

Races

Standings

Drivers' Championship
Points were awarded on a 20, 15, 12, 10, 8, 6, 4, 3, 2, 1 basis to the top 10 finishers in each race. No bonus points were awarded for pole positions or fastest laps. All scores counted towards the championship.

Teams' Championship
Points were awarded on a 20, 15, 12, 10, 8, 6, 4, 3, 2, 1 basis to the top 10 finishers in each race, however only the two highest placed cars from each team scored points. No bonus points were awarded for pole positions or fastest laps. All scores counted towards the championship.

External links
 Speedfreaks
 Motorsport.com

European Touring Car Championship seasons
European Touring Car Championship
2000 in European sport